HMS Halifax was the French privateer brig Marie that the Royal Navy captured in November 1797 and took into service. The Navy sold her in 1801 and she became the merchantman Halifax. She sailed between Portsmouth and Newfoundland and was last listed in 1808.

French privateer
Marie was a privateer brig from an unknown home port in the Caribbean.

, Captain Charles Stirling, captured the French privateer brig Marie off Belle Isle on 21 November 1797. Marie was armed with 14 guns and had a crew of 60 men.

Royal Navy
Marie arrived in Plymouth on 8 December 1797 and was laid up. Between December 1801 and July 1801 she underwent fitting for sea. The Admiralty initially named her HMS Mary, but renamed her HMS Halifax prior to her commissioning.

Lieutenant J. Scott commissioned Halifax in 1801. On 22 November it was reported at Plymouth that Halifax, Lieutenant J. Scott, had departed for  Bantry Bay on 1 November, but had not arrived there by the 12th. As she had been out in the hurricanes on 1 and 2 November it was feared that she might have been lost. She was deleted from the Navy list that same year.

Mercantile service
Halifax was not lost but instead appeared in the Register of Shipping (RS) in 1802. The entry described her as a prize taken in 1797, and reported that she had undergone repairs in 1801.

Fate
Halifax was last listed in Lloyd's Register in 1808.

Notes

Citations

References
 
 

1790s ships
Privateer ships of France
Captured ships
Brigs of the Royal Navy
Age of Sail merchant ships of England